Ian Giles may refer to:

 Ian Giles (footballer) (1918–2002), Australian footballer
 Ian Giles (singer) (born 1954), English folk singer with Magpie Lane